Agrilus derasofasciatus, the vine jewel beetle, is a species of metallic wood-boring beetle in the family Buprestidae. It is found in Africa, Europe and Northern Asia (excluding China), and North America.

References

Further reading

External links

 

derasofasciatus
Articles created by Qbugbot
Beetles described in 1835